Velma may refer to:

People 
 Velma Abbott (1929–1987), Canadian baseball player
 Velma Barfield (1932–1984), American murderer
 Velma Wayne Dawson (1912–2007), American puppet maker
 Velma Demerson (1920-2019), Canadian woman imprisoned for having a baby out of wedlock with a Chinese man
 Velma Dunn (1918–2007), American diver
 Velma Gaines-Hamock (1910–2000), American funeral home owner
 Velma Bronn Johnston (1912–1977), American animal rights activist
 Velma Caldwell Melville (1852–1924), American writer and poet
 Velma Middleton (1917–1961), American jazz vocalist
 Velma Pollard (born 1937), Jamaican poet and fiction writer
 Velma Wallace Rayness (1896–1977), American artist, author, and instructor
 Velma Springstead (1906–1926), Canadian athlete for whom the Velma Springstead Trophy is named
 Velma Veloria (born 1950), Filipino-American politician
 Velma Wallis (born 1960), American novelist
Velma Owusu-Bempah (born 1981), milliner

Fictional characters
Velma Dinkley, a character in Scooby-Doo franchise
Velma Kelly, fictional character in the musical and the 2002 film adaptation of Chicago
Velma, a character in the 1976 film Bugsy Malone
Velma Valento, fictional character in the 1940 novel Farewell, My Lovely by Raymond Chandler
Velma Von Tussle, a character in the 1988 film Hairspray and its later adaptations

Places
Velma, Illinois
Velma, Nebraska
Velma, Oklahoma
Velma, Virginia

Other uses
 Velma (TV series), a 2023 streaming series featuring the Scooby Doo character

See also 
 Thelma (disambiguation)
 Wilma (given name)

English given names
Feminine given names
English feminine given names